Tracy Kennedy is a Canadian curler from Thunder Bay, Ontario.

In 1994, she was inducted into Canadian Curling Hall of Fame together with all of the Heather Houston 1988 and 1989 team.

Personal life
Kennedy grew up in Thunder Bay, Ontario (Fort William). As of 2014, Kennedy is the general manager of two hotel properties in Thunder Bay. Her father, Darwin Wark represented Northern Ontario at the 1959 Macdonald Brier, while her husband Bruce is a four-time Northern Ontario champion, and winner of the 1982 Air Canada Silver Broom world curling championships.

Awards
STOH All-Star Team: , .

Teams and events

References

External links
 
 Tracy Kennedy – Curling Canada Stats Archive
 1988 & 89 Houston Heather Women's Curling Rink - NWO Sports Hall of Fame - Inductees
 Canada's Greatest Curlers: Female Candidates - TSN.ca (look at "Female lead")
 

Living people

Curlers from Thunder Bay
Canadian women curlers
World curling champions
Canadian women's curling champions
Year of birth missing (living people)